Herashchenko is a surname. Notable people with the surname include: 

Anton  Herashchenko (born 1979), Ukrainian politician
Iryna Herashchenko (athlete) (born 1995), Ukrainian high jumper
Iryna Herashchenko (politician) (born 1971), Ukrainian politician
Volodymyr Herashchenko (born 1968), Ukrainian football player and coach